Lucio Redivo (born February 14, 1994) is an Argentine-Italian professional basketball player who last played for New Basket Brindisi in the Italian Lega Basket Serie A (LBA) and the FIBA Basketball Champions League (BCL). He can play at both the point guard and shooting guard positions, with shooting guard being his main position.

Professional career
Redivo started his professional career with the Argentine club Bahía Basket in 2012. On August 26, 2017, he joined the Spanish club Bilbao Basket. In 2017–18 season, he averaged 10.2 points over 33 games in the Spanish League. He also appeared in 9 games of EuroCup and averaged 9.6 points, 1.4 assists and 1.1 rebounds per game.

On August 1, 2018, he signed a contract with the Spanish club CB Breogán. Over 32 Spanish League games, he averaged 10.8 points, 2.2 assists and 1.9 rebounds per game.

He played Los Aguacateros of the Mexican Basketball League in the season 2019–20 and the next year (season 2020–21), he played in the Italian Serie A2 for Casale Monferrato.

At the beginning of the 2021–22 season, Redivo was called by Brindisi in the Serie A to replace the injured Wes Clark with a short term contract, with the possibility to extend it to the end of the season.

National team career
Redivo has been a member of the senior Argentine national basketball team. He played with Argentina at the 2017 FIBA AmeriCup. In 2019, he took part in the team that won the Pan American gold medal in Lima. He was included in the Argentine squad for the 2019 FIBA Basketball World Cup and clinched silver medal with Argentina which emerged as runners-up to Spain at the 2019 FIBA Basketball World Cup.

References

External links
 Lucio Redivo at acb.com 
 Lucio Redivo at euroleague.net
 Lucio Redivo at fiba.com
 Lucio Redivo at latinbasket.com
 

1994 births
Living people
2019 FIBA Basketball World Cup players
Argentine expatriate basketball people in Spain
Argentine men's basketball players
Basketball players at the 2019 Pan American Games
Bilbao Basket players
CB Breogán players
Estudiantes de Bahía Blanca basketball players
Italian expatriate basketball people in Spain
Italian men's basketball players
Liga ACB players
Medalists at the 2019 Pan American Games
New Basket Brindisi players
Pan American Games gold medalists for Argentina
Pan American Games medalists in basketball
Point guards
Shooting guards
Sportspeople from Bahía Blanca